Clements Frederick Jackson (24 April 1873, in Double Bay, New South Wales, Australia – 27 February 1955, in Brisbane, Queensland, Australia) was an Australian mining engineer.

References

1873 births
1955 deaths
Australian mining engineers